Suburban Secrets is a 2007 American non-fiction television series created by truTV. It is produced by Sirens Media. The show is described as being a cross between City Confidential and Desperate Housewives.

Some cities that the show has documented:
Pleasant Garden, North Carolina
Grapevine, Texas
Aliquippa, Pennsylvania
Little Compton, Rhode Island
Marion, Virginia
Red Bluff, California
Bridgton, Maine
Olathe, Kansas

Notable cases documented:
Sarah Marie Johnson (Idaho)
Christopher McCowen (Massachusetts)
Hope Schreiner (Vermont)
Rachelle Waterman (Alaska)
Diane King (Michigan)
Mark Mangelsdorf and Melinda Harmon Raisch (Kansas)

References

External links
truTV Suburban Secrets website
Suburban Secrets IMDB
Sirens Media

2007 American television series debuts
2000s American crime television series
English-language television shows
TruTV original programming